The 1993 Japanese Formula 3000 Championship was scheduled over 11 rounds and contested over 9 rounds. 22 different teams, 30 different drivers, 3 different chassis and 3 different engines competed.

Calendar

All rounds took place at venues located within the country of Japan.

Note:

The weekend in Fuji with the race cancelled on September, 5 saw only practice and qualification sections.

Final point standings

Driver

For every race points were awarded: 9 points to the winner, 6 for runner-up, 4 for third place, 3 for fourth place, 2 for fifth place and 1 for sixth place. No additional points were awarded. The best 6 results count.

Note:

Kazuyoshi Hoshino became champion on countback as they had 2 wins while Eddie Irvine only had 1.

Complete Overview

R=retired NS=did not start

Formula 3000
Super Formula